The 1915–16 Yale Bulldogs men's ice hockey season was the 21st season of play for the program.

Season
In case there was any doubt as to the student body's interest in hockey, Yale had the largest number of underclassmen try out for the team at the Beginning of December. 110 men, 63 of which were freshman, attended the first tryout. The team got to work preparing for the three game series with Princeton that would open their season. After arriving in Pittsburgh, however, the Tigers were the ones who appeared ready by winning the first two games. One aspect both teams had to adjust to was the large size of the rink, far larger than either typically experienced. Yale did finally acclimate in the third game but the team knew they had work ahead of them.

Yale officially opened its intercollegiate season with decisive wins over Mass Ag. and MIT but were once more beaten by Princeton, despite a valiant effort from York in goal.

A game that was scheduled against Cornell was cancelled. Rather than lose the game time, the team had a rematch with the New Haven Arena Team and won another lopsided game. After getting shelled by the Boston Athletic Association, Yale faced Dartmouth and the two team battled intensely to a 3–3 tie after 40 minutes. The teams agreed that the first to score would be the winner but it wouldn't be until the third overtime session that Washburn tilted the scales in Yale's favor.

The first game against Harvard came next and, while the Elis were playing well, the Crimson had allowed just one goal in their previous five games combined (all wins). The trend continued as Yale was unable to solve Wylde and lost 0–2. The team rebounded in the next game, blanking Williams 5–0 for the Bulldogs' first shutout in over two years. The team was in such control of the game that they played a majority of their substitutes throughout the contest, including in goal.

Yale faced Princeton in a rematch with three of its regulars ruled ineligible. Despite the handicap, a masterful performance by York and a hat-trick from Gould gave the Elis the win 3–1 and set up a rubber match a few days later. The game was rough but clean and Yale defeated Princeton for the series win, their second victory over the Tigers in as many years. The second match with Harvard went much as the first had, however, Yale was able to score twice against Wylde, something no other college was able to do that year.

With both a coach and an assistant coach, no team manager was needed.

Roster

Standings

Schedule and Results

|-
!colspan=12 style="color:white; background:#00356B" | Regular Season

References

Yale Bulldogs men's ice hockey seasons
Yale
Yale
Yale
Yale